Bhanguri is a village in Dhar Kalan in Pathankot district of Punjab State, India. The village is administrated by Sarpanch an elected representative of the village.

Demography 
, The village has a total number of 336 houses and the population of 1695 of which 846 are males while 849 are females according to the report published by Census India in 2011. The literacy rate of the village is 86.41%, highest than the state average of 75.84%. The population of children under the age of 6 years is 201 which is 11.86% of total population of the village, and child sex ratio is approximately 718 lower than the state average of 846.

Most of the people are from Schedule Caste which constitutes 19.53% of total population in the village. The town does not have any Schedule Tribe population so far.

As per census 2011, 485 people were engaged in work activities out of the total population of the village which includes 397 males and 88 females. According to census survey report 2011, 88.45% workers describe their work as main work and 11.55% workers are involved in marginal activity providing the livelihood for less than 6 months.

Transport 

See also
List of villages in India

References 

Villages in Pathankot district